This Is Buck Hill is the debut album by saxophonist Buck Hill which was recorded in 1978 and released on the SteepleChase label.

Reception

The AllMusic review by Scott Yanow stated "Hill received some initial publicity because of his unusual situation, being a mailman during the day and a part-time player at night. However, he certainly sounds like a world-class post-bop player on this date ... Recommended".

Track listing
All compositions by Buck Hill except where noted
 "Toku Do" (Buster Williams) – 8:46
 "Yesterdays" (Jerome Kern, Otto Harbach) – 9:34
 "Oleo" (Sonny Rollins) – 5:11
 "I'm Aquarius" – 6:54
 "S.M.Y." – 7:42
 "Two Chord Molly" – 10:23
 "S.M.Y." [take 2] – 7:16 Additional track on CD release

Personnel
Buck Hill – tenor saxophone
Kenny Barron – piano 
Buster Williams – bass 
Billy Hart – drums

References

SteepleChase Records albums
Buck Hill (musician) albums
1978 albums